Fernão Ferro is a civil parish, in the municipality of Seixal in the district of Setúbal, Portugal. It is part of the Lisbon metropolitan area. The population in 2011 was 17 059, in an area of 24.13 km².

The parish was created on June 1, 1993 from separating from the parishes of Aldeia de Paio Pires, Amora and Arrentela.

References

1993 establishments in Portugal
Freguesias of Seixal